Adolphe Engers (1884–1945) was a Dutch writer and actor on stage and in the movies, who appeared in more than fifty films during his career, a number of them in Weimar Germany.

Biography
Before his career in film, he was an actor on the stage and a writer. In 1920, he published Peccavi...???, a then-scandalous novel with a gay protagonist, co-written with fellow actor Ernst Winar. A performer of considerable talent, he was to be honored for his achievements on the stage in the 1930s by an honorary committee that included Simon Carmiggelt, who related that, when the committee members understood that Engers himself was gay, withdrew from the committee one after the other.

Other works were a screenplay about the closing of the Zuiderzee, which created the artificial lake IJsselmeer, in which he was to act as well (only promotional footage for the project seems to remain), and a play about Oscar Wilde, published in 1917, whose main themes are norms and deviancy; "deviancy" in Engers' play includes art and beauty, which are crushed by the normality of everyday society.

He appeared in the 1922 German-Dutch co-production The Man in the Background.

Selected filmography

References

Bibliography 
 Andriopoulos, Stefan. Possessed: Hypnotic Crimes, Corporate Fiction, and the Invention of Cinema. University of Chicago Press, 2008.

External links 
 

1884 births
1955 deaths
Dutch male film actors
Dutch male silent film actors
People from Gulpen-Wittem